is a 2019 Japanese crime film directed by Masayuki Suzuki. A sequel, Masquerade Night, was released in September 2021.

Plot

During an investigation of a serial killer in Tokyo, police are led to a hotel that may be where the next murder will take place. Detective Nitta Kosuke goes undercover and begins working at the front desk of the hotel. Yamagishi Naomi works at the front desk of the hotel. She is selected to train Kosuke for his front desk job. Kosuke is focused on catching the killer, but Naomi prioritizes the safety of the guests.

Cast

References

External links 

2019 crime films
Films based on works by Keigo Higashino
Japanese crime films
Films produced by Kazutoshi Wadakura
Films scored by Naoki Satō
Films set in hotels
Films set in Tokyo
2010s Japanese films
2010s Japanese-language films